The Stanislaus County Sheriff's Department (SCSD) is an American law enforcement agency that is charged with law enforcement duties within the boundaries of Stanislaus County, California. As of the 2020 United States census, the county was inhabited by just under 552,880 people.

History
In 2012, Deputy Robert Paris and civilian locksmith Glendon David Engert were shot and killed while attempting an eviction. The shooter, James Ferrario, 45 years old, subsequently shot and killed himself.

In April 2012, a member of the sheriff's department stun-gunned and fatally shot an unarmed man suffering from mental illness.

On November 13, 2016, Deputy Dennis Wallace was murdered in Fox Grove Park near the City of Hughson by David Machado. Sheriff Adam Christianson reported the gun used was in contact with Deputy Wallace's head when it was fired. Prosecutors are seeking the death penalty for Machado.

Line of duty deaths
Since the department's establishment, 6 sworn deputies have died in the line of duty, as well as 2 non-sworn members;1 Crime Scene Technician and 1 Community Service officer.

Sworn Deputies:

Non-Sworn members:

Notes

References

External links
 
 
 
 

Government of Stanislaus County, California
Sheriffs' departments of California